Robert Bartnik (1956-2022) was an Australian mathematician based at Monash University.  He is known for his contributions to the rigorous mathematical study of general relativity. He received his bachelor's and master's degrees from Melbourne University and a PhD in mathematics from Princeton University in 1983, where his advisor was Shing-Tung Yau. In 2004 he was elected to the Australian Academy of Science, with citation:

His work with John McKinnon has been widely studied in the physics literature. They show that there is a discrete set of static solutions to the coupled Einstein/Yang-Mills equations which are geodesically complete and asymptotically flat. This is interesting since such solutions are known not to exist in the cases of the Einstein vacuum equations, the coupled Einstein/Maxwell equations, and the Yang-Mills equations. Although Bartnik and McKinnon's work was numerical, their observed phenomena has been mathematically justified by Joel Smoller, Arthur Wasserman, Shing-Tung Yau, and Joel McLeod.

In the mathematics literature, he is known for his work with Leon Simon on solving the Dirichlet problem for prescribed mean curvature, in the setting of spacelike hypersurfaces of Minkowski space. His most widely cited work is on the geometric and analytic study of the ADM mass. He shows that it is geometrically defined by constructing "optimal" asymptotically flat coordinates, and gives an extension of Edward Witten's proof of the time-symmetric positive energy theorem to the higher-dimensional spin setting.

He was a visiting scholar at the Institute for Advanced Study in 1980-81.

Major publications
As of 2022, Bartnik has been the author of around 30 research articles. The following publications are among the best-known:

His collected works were published in 2021:

References 

 

 

Fellows of the Australian Academy of Science
Institute for Advanced Study visiting scholars
Mathematicians from Melbourne
Living people
University of Melbourne alumni
Princeton University alumni
Year of birth missing (living people)